The Barooga Football Netball Club, nicknamed the Hawks, is an Australian rules football and netball club based in the town of Barooga located in the Riverina district of New South Wales.

The club was formed in 1894 and initially played in the Murray Border Football Association in 1894.

When the club won the Federal District Football Association premiership against Cobram Football Club in 1897, they were known as "The Boomerangs" and wore a red and white uniform.

When Barooga FC re-formed in 1907 they wore an all-blue uniform in the Goulburn Valley Football Association in 1907 and 1908.

In 1911, the Boomanoomana Rovers Junior Football Club was established and played in the official Goulburn Valley Junior Football Association (GVJFA) and played their matches in Barooga and in the maroon and gold colours.

The Boomanoomana Rovers won the GVJFA premiership in 1913  and then entered a team in the Goulburn Valley Football Association senior football competition in 1914, then from 1919 to 1921.

Barooga FC were in recess in five separate periods in its early days, until 1929 when it joined the Southern Riverina Football Association for a two-year stint.

Barooga FC then became founding member of the new Murray Football League in 1931. In 1936 Cobram and Barooga football clubs merged and played as the Cobram Barooga United FC for a single season, before the club was officially disbanded in April 1937. The two clubs then reformed as independent bodies, with Cobram re-joining the Murray FL and Barooga joining the Southern Riverina FL.

The club moved across to the Picola & District league in 1959.

The club re-joined the Murray Football League in 1989 where it currently fields four football and eight netball teams each week.

Barooga Football Competitions Timeline
Murray Border Football Association
 1894
Barooga Football Club
 1895 and 1896 – club in recess
Federal District Football Association
1897
Barooga Football Club
 1898 and 1899 – club in recess
Federal District Football Association
1900 
Barooga Football Club
 1901 – club in recess
Federal District Football Association
1902
Barooga Football Club
 1903 to 1906 – club in recess
Goulburn Valley Football Association
1907 to 1908
Barooga Football Club
1909 to 1928 – club in recess
Southern Riverina Football Association
1929 to 1930
Murray Football League
1931 to 1935
Murray Football League
1936 (Barooga & Cobram merge for 1936 & finish on the bottom)
Southern Riverina Football Association
1937 to 1938
Barooga Football Club
 1939 to 1943 – Club in recess
Picola & District Football League
1959 to 1988
Murray Football League
1989 to present day

Football Premierships
Seniors
 Federal District Football Association (1)
 1897
 Picola & District Football League (9):
 1960, 1961, 1976, 1978, 1979, 1981, 1982, 1986, 1987
 Murray Football League (4): 
 1992, 1993, 1994, 1997

Reserves
Murray Valley Football Second Eighteen Football Association
 1936 – Cobram / Barooga United FC
 1950, 1952, 1953, 1956 – Barooga FC

VFL / AFL players
The following footballers played with Barooga prior to playing senior VFL / AFL football, with the year indicating their debut.
 1926 – Stuart Russell – Essendon & Hawthorn
 1936 – Sam Snell – St. Kilda
 1981 – Bernard Toohey – Geelong, Sydney Swans & Footscray
 1985 – Gerard Toohey – Geelong
 1988 – John Brinkkotter – Sydney Swans
 1990 – Chris O'Dwyer – Sydney Swans
 2002 – Chris Hyde – Richmond

References

External links
 
 Gameday website

Murray Football League clubs
Sports clubs established in 1894
Australian rules football clubs established in 1894
1894 establishments in Australia
Netball teams in New South Wales